Horia is a genus of beetles in the family Meloidae. They are placed in a tribe Horiini which includes two other genera Synhoria and Cissites.

Some species in the genus live in the brood colonies of Xylocopa bees. Horia maculata was introduced to Hawaii to control Xylocopa but the beetles did not establish a stable population.

References

External links
 Images

Meloidae